Chartered accountants were the first accountants to form a professional accounting body, initially established in Scotland in 1854. The Edinburgh Society of Accountants (1854), the Glasgow Institute of Accountants and Actuaries (1854) and the Aberdeen Society of Accountants (1867) were each granted a royal charter almost from their inception. The title is an internationally recognised professional designation; the certified public accountant designation is generally equivalent to it. Women were able to become chartered accountants only following the Sex Disqualification (Removal) Act 1919 after which, in 1920, Mary Harris Smith was recognised by the Institute of Chartered Accountants in England and Wales and became the first woman chartered accountant in the world.

Chartered accountants work in all fields of business and finance, including auditing, taxation, financial and general management. Some are engaged in public practice work, others work in the private sector and some are employed by government bodies.

Chartered accountants' institutes require members to undertake a minimum level of continuing professional development to stay professionally competitive.
They facilitate special interest groups (for instance, entertainment and media, or insolvency and restructuring) which lead in their fields. They provide support to members by offering advisory services, technical helplines and technical libraries. They also offer opportunities for professional networking, career and business development.

Chartered Accountants Worldwide comprises 15 institutes with over 1.8 million Chartered Accountants and students in 190 countries.

Countries

Australia 
Chartered accountants of Australia belong to the Chartered Accountants Australia & New Zealand (CA ANZ, formerly the Institute of Chartered Accountants in Australia) and use the designatory letters CA.  Some senior members (at least 15 years' membership) of the institute may be elected fellows and use the letters FCA. Of equal legal status and recognition in Australia as qualified professional accountants are Institute of Public Accountants (IPA) and CPA Australia. On 28 June 2016, the Association of Chartered Certified Accountants (ACCA) and CA ANZ announced a strategic alliance to provide an opportunity for dual membership of both bodies, which will add value for the members locally and globally. ACCA members resident in Australia and New Zealand will be invited to apply for CA membership and CA ANZ members will be invited to apply for ACCA membership, subject to meeting the eligibility criteria of the other body.

Bangladesh
The Institute of Chartered Accountants of Bangladesh (ICAB) is the national professional accounting body of Bangladesh. Established in 1973, it is the sole organization with the right to award the Chartered Accountant designation in Bangladesh. Senior members (at least five years' membership) of the institute are called "fellow members" and use the letters FCA.

Bangladesh has more than 1,900 registered Chartered Accountants and more than 32,000 articled students.

Bermuda
The Institute of Chartered Accountants of Bermuda works with the Canadian Institute of Chartered Accountants and American Institute of Certified Public Accountants, and is the sole organisation in Bermuda with the right to award the Chartered Accountant designation.

Canada 

In Canada, chartered accountants belong to the Canadian Institute of Chartered Accountants (CICA) by way of membership in at least one provincial or territorial institute (or "order" in Quebec). In order to become a member, a candidate requires an undergraduate degree plus experience and, depending on the province, additional education. Candidates in all provinces are required to pass the three-day Uniform Evaluation (UFE) now Common Final Examination (CFE).

Since 2012, the CICA has been in a process of unification with the other two accounting bodies in Canada. Canadian CA's, along with Certified General Accountants (CGAs) and Certified Management Accountants (CMAs), have now adopted the designation Chartered Professional Accountant (CPA), making the term "chartered accountant" obsolete.

Czech Republic 
In the Czech Republic, Chartered Accountants are generally members of Institute of Chartered Accountants of the Czech Republic and use the designatory letters CAE (Chartered Accountant expert). Chartered Accountants may also be members of the Chamber of Auditors of the Czech Republic (KACR), with whom the ICAEW launched its ACA qualification in 2015.

European Union 
Under the Mutual Recognition Directive, European Economic Area (EEA) and Swiss nationals holding a professional qualification can become members of the equivalent bodies in another member state.
They must, however, pass an aptitude test in understanding local conditions (which for accountants will include local tax and company law variations).

The local title is, however, not available for use if the professional does not choose to join the local professional body. For example, a holder of the French   qualification could practise as an accountant in England without taking a local test but could only describe themself as "expert-comptable (France)" not "Chartered Accountant".  Within the EEA, only the UK and Ireland have bodies that issue the Chartered Accountant title.

India
In India, Chartered Accountants are regulated by the Institute of Chartered Accountants of India (ICAI) which was established by the Chartered Accountants Act, 1949. 
Associate members of the ICAI are entitled to add the prefix CA to their names. Members who are in full-time practice, and have completed five years of practice, can use Fellow Chartered Accountant(FCA). As of 1 April 2021, the Institute had 327,081 members.

Entry to the profession can be made by taking the CA Foundation Course after completion of schooling (12th grade). Alternatively, graduates may train as an articled assistant for three years in a chartered firm before  final exam or after completion of Intermediate of Cost Accountant or Company Secretary.
A comprehensive 100 hours of information technology training and an orientation programme for soft skills development have to be completed before being articled. However the CA certification is limited to the geographical boundary of India and is not valid in countries that follow different standards of accounting practice. After clearing of CA final examination, one may apply for membership to ICAI.

Indonesia 

The Institute of Indonesia Chartered Accountants, formerly Indonesian Institute of Accountants or Ikatan Akuntan Indonesia is the national organisation of professional accountants in Indonesia. IAI is a founding member of the International Federation of Accountants (IFAC) and the ASEAN Federation of Accountants (AFA).
In 2016 IAI became an Associate Member of Chartered Accountants Worldwide.

Ireland 
In Ireland, Chartered Accountants are generally members of Chartered Accountants Ireland and use the designatory letters ACA or FCA. Chartered accountants may also be members of the Institute of Chartered Accountants in England and Wales or the Institute of Chartered Accountants of Scotland.

Nepal 
In Nepal, the profession of Chartered Accountancy is regulated by the Institute of Chartered Accountants of Nepal (ICAN) which was established by parliament under the Chartered Accountants Act, 1997.

After completion of three levels of examination (CAP I, CAP II, and CAP III) with three years of articleship training under a qualified CA, one can get the membership of ICAN and with the Certificate of Practice (COP), one can practise as a professional accountant.

New Zealand 
In New Zealand, Chartered Accountants belong to the Chartered Accountants Australia & New Zealand (CA ANZ, formerly New Zealand Institute of Chartered Accountants) and use the designatory letters CA. Some senior members may be elected fellows and use the letters FCA.

There is also a mid-tier qualification called Associate Chartered Accountant with the designatory letters ACA. Associate chartered accountants are not eligible to hold a certificate of public practice and therefore cannot offer services to the public.

Pakistan 
The Institute of Chartered Accountants of Pakistan (ICAP) is the professional body of Chartered Accountants in Pakistan, established on 1 July 1961 under the Chartered Accountants Ordinance, 1961. ICAP is the sole body and authority in Pakistan which has a mandate to regulate the accounting and auditing profession in the country. It adopts and develops the national auditing standards and develops accounting standards for the Securities and Exchange Commission of Pakistan (SECP). It represents accountants employed in public practice, business and industry, and the public sector. The institute is a member of the International Federation of Accountants (IFAC), which is the global organization for the accountancy profession.

ICAP has more than 7,000 active members and more than 25,000 students. Other national accountancy bodies include Institute of cost and management accountants of Pakistan (ICMAP), PIPFA, etc. ICAP and ICMAP are full members of International federation of accountants and PIPFA is an associate member. Besides these national accountancy bodies, Association of Chartered Certified Accountants (ACCA) & Chartered Institute of Management Accountants (CIMA) UK Bodies also has a strong presence in Pakistan.

Singapore 
The Chartered Accountant of Singapore (CA (Singapore)) title is protected under the Singapore Accountancy Commission (SAC) Act. The pathway to obtain the designation is owned by the SAC, a statutory body of the government. The Institute of Singapore Chartered Accountants (ISCA) is a designated entity in the SAC Act and confers the CA (Singapore) designation on behalf of SAC. The Singapore Chartered Accountant Qualification programme has three components: academic base, professional programme and 3 years of practical experience. ISCA and the SAC have worked to raise the profile and promote the Singapore CA Qualification for international recognition.

Applicants who are eligible for the Singapore Chartered Accountant Qualification foundation programme should have either accredited degrees, other degrees, undergraduates and local polytechnic diplomas. Those with who are eligible for direct entry into the professional programme should have local accountancy degrees from Nanyang Technological University, National University of Singapore, Singapore Management University, Singapore University of Social Sciences, and Singapore Institute of Technology.

In 2013, holders of Association of Chartered Certified Accountants (ACCA) and CPA Australia have until 31 December 2016 and existing students have until 31 December 2018 to complete the ICPAS PAC and qualify for the "Chartered Accountant of Singapore" professional designation through the previous transitional arrangements.

South Africa 
In South Africa, SAICA, the South African Institute of Chartered Accountants, regulates the Chartered Accountant (South Africa) designation, CA (SA).

To qualify as a CA (SA), one requires a specialised bachelor's degree in accounting, followed by a Certificate in the Theory of Accounting (CTA); depending on the university, this is offered as a postgraduate honours degree or as a postgraduate diploma. This formal education is followed by two external competency exams set by SAICA.

A separate registration is needed for Chartered Accountants wishing to act as auditors in public practice as a registered auditor (RA). The RA designation is conferred by IRBA (Independent Regulatory Board For Auditors, previously known as Public Accountants and Auditors Board [PAAB]) under the Auditing Profession Act (AP Act).

Candidates must complete three years of practical experience, working for a registered training office – the Training In Public Practice (TIPP) programme. Articled clerks who switch employers during this period are required to extend their training by six months. The Training Outside Public Practice (TOPP) programme has a financial management focus; TOPP trainees can thus become Chartered Accountants with a more limited knowledge and experience of auditing than those who undergo the TIPP programme, but with a more extensive financial management and business experience.

Chartered accountants who are not registered auditors may not act as or hold out to be auditors in public practice.  However, the AP Act does not prohibit non-RAs from using the description 'internal auditor' or 'accountant', or from auditing a not-for-profit club, institution or association if they receive no fee for such audit.

In South Africa the Companies Act was replaced, with effect in July 2010, to allow companies without a public interest to choose between an audit or an independent review. A review is not an attest function and can be performed by accountants who are members of bodies that are registered in terms of the Close Corporations Act of 1984, which include SAIBA, CIMA, SAICA, SAIPA and ACCA.

Sri Lanka 
In Sri Lanka, the title of Chartered Accountant (CA Sri Lanka) can be used by only members of the Institute of Chartered Accountants of Sri Lanka. These could be Associate Members (ACA) and Fellows (FCA). Chartered accountants holding practising certificates may also become Registered Auditors, who are able to perform statutory financial audits in accordance with the Companies Act, No. 07 of 2007. Chartered Accountants can also register as company secretaries.

United Kingdom  

The Institute of Chartered Accountants in England and Wales is an awarding body, conferring the postnominals ACA and FCA. 
The Institute of Chartered Accountants of Scotland confers the postnominals CA.

List of institutes of chartered accountants 
 Association of Chartered Certified Accountants (global)
 Bahamas Institute of Chartered Accountants
 Chartered Professional Accountants of Canada as a result of merger of Canadian Institute of Chartered Accountants (CICA), Society of Management Accountants of Canada (CMA Canada) and Certified General Accountants of Canada (CGA-Canada) in 2014
 Chartered Accountants Australia and New Zealand as a result of merger of New Zealand Institute of Chartered Accountants (NZICA) and the Institute of Chartered Accountants Australia (ICAA) in 2013
 Chartered Accountants Ireland (also covers Northern Ireland)
 Chartered Management Accountant (CIMA)
 Chartered Institute of Public Finance and Accountancy (CIPFA)
 European Institute of Chartered Accountants
 Institute of Chartered Accountants of Bangladesh
 Institute of Chartered Accountants of Barbados
 Institute of Chartered Accountants of Belize
 Institute of Chartered Accountants of Bermuda
 Institute of Chartered Accountants of the Eastern Caribbean
 Institute of Chartered Accountants in England & Wales
 Institute of Chartered Accountants of Ghana
 Institute of Chartered Accountants of Guyana
 Institute of Chartered Accountants of India
 Institute of Chartered Accountants of Indonesia
 Institute of Chartered Accountants of Jamaica
 Institute of Chartered Accountants in Malawi
 Institute of Chartered Accountants of Namibia
 Institute of Chartered Accountants of Nepal
 Institute of Chartered Accountants of Nigeria
 Institute of Chartered Accountants of Pakistan
 Institute of Chartered Accountants of Scotland
 Institute of Chartered Accountants of Sierra Leone
 Institute of Chartered Accountants of Sri Lanka
 Institute of Chartered Accountants of Trinidad and Tobago
 Institute of Chartered Accountants of Zimbabwe
 Institute of Indonesia Chartered Accountants
 Institute of Singapore Chartered Accountants
 Royal Netherlands Institute of Chartered Accountants
 South African Institute of Chartered Accountants
 Zambia Institute of Chartered Accountants

References

Accounting qualifications